Captain John Allen, 4th Viscount Allen (b. bef. 1726 – 10 November 1753), was an Irish peer and politician.

He was the son of Hon. Richard A. Allen and Dorothy Green, and grandson of John Allen, 1st Viscount Allen. Allen sat as member of parliament (MP) for Wicklow County from 1742 until 1745, when he succeeded his cousin as Viscount Allen on the latter's death.

Allen never married and, on his death, his titles passed to his younger brother.

1753 deaths
Irish MPs 1727–1760
Members of the Parliament of Ireland (pre-1801) for County Wicklow constituencies
Year of birth uncertain
Members of the Irish House of Lords
John 4